Khairul Manazil or Khair-ul-Manazil is a historical masjid built in 1561 in New Delhi, India. The masjid is situated in the opposite of Purana Qila on Mathura Road, south east to Sher Shah Gate. The gateway of the masjid was made by red sandstone following Mughal architecture, but the inside structure of the building was made in Delhi Sultanate pattern.

Currently the masjid is protected and maintained by the Archaeological Survey of India (ASI).

History 
This structure was built by one of the most influential and powerful women of Akbar's court Maham Anga who was Emperor Akbar's wet nurse cum foster mother. It is stated that in 1564, Akbar was attacked near the masjid by an assassin while he was returning from Nizamuddin Dargah. Later it was used as Madrasa. Presently the building is under protection of  Archaeological Survey of India.

The epigraphy in Persian carved on the marble plaque above the arch of the central gate is a chronogram penned by Emperor Akbar's court historian and poet
Maulana Shihabuddin Ahmad Khan (Pen name: Baazil) who is also accredited as the composer of the eulogy on the tombstone of Amir Khusrau at the shrine of Hazrat Nizamuddin, some two hundred and ten years after Khusrau's death. The letters forming the words "Khairul Manazil" in Arabic when translated in their numeric equivalent by the rule of ٲٻڄݚ and summed up to give the numerals of Hijri year 969 equivalent to 1561 AD.

References 

Archaeological monuments in Delhi
Mosques in Delhi
Mughal mosques
Sandstone buildings in India
Monuments of National Importance in Delhi